In graph theory and recreational mathematics, the Hanoi graphs are undirected graphs whose vertices represent the possible states of the Tower of Hanoi puzzle, and whose edges represent allowable moves between pairs of states.

Construction

The puzzle consists of a set of disks of different sizes, placed in increasing order of size on a fixed set of towers.
The Hanoi graph for a puzzle with  disks on  towers is denoted . Each state of the puzzle is determined by the choice of one tower for each disk, so the graph has  vertices.

In the moves of the puzzle, the smallest disk on one tower is moved either to an unoccupied tower or to a tower whose smallest disk is larger. If there are  unoccupied towers, the number of allowable moves is

which ranges from a maximum of 
The total number of edges is

For  (no disks) there is only one state of the puzzle and one vertex of the graph.
For , the Hanoi graph  can be decomposed into  copies of the smaller Hanoi graph , one for each placement of the largest disk. These copies are connected to each other only at states where the largest disk is free to move: it is the only disk in its tower, and some other tower is unoccupied.

General properties

Every Hanoi graph contains a Hamiltonian cycle.

The Hanoi graph  is a complete graph on  vertices. Because they contain complete graphs, all larger Hanoi graphs  require at least  colors in any graph coloring. They may be colored with exactly  colors by summing the indexes of the towers containing each disk, and using the sum modulo  as the color.

Three towers
These graphs have  vertices and  edges.
They are penny graphs (the contact graphs of non-overlapping unit disks in the plane), with an arrangement of disks that resembles the Sierpinski triangle. One way of constructing this arrangement is to arrange the numbers of Pascal's triangle on the points of a hexagonal lattice, with unit spacing, and place a unit disk on each point whose number is odd.

More than three towers

For , the structure of the Hanoi graphs is not as well understood, and the diameter of these graphs is unknown.

See also 
 Sierpinski triangle

References

Parametric families of graphs
Planar graphs